Gatliff is an unincorporated community and coal town located in Whitley County, Kentucky, United States.

A post office was established in the community in 1908 and named for physician and mine proprietor Dr. Ancil Gatliff.

References

Unincorporated communities in Whitley County, Kentucky
Unincorporated communities in Kentucky
Coal towns in Kentucky